is a former Japanese footballer who played as a defender.

Club career
Moriyasu was born in the United States, and first played for Dallas Texans before moving to Japan where he played football for his high school team, as well as college football.

He was on the verge of quitting football to search for a more conventional career when he received the opportunity to play in Australia in March 2010. He subsequently signed for New South Wales Premier League club APIA Leichhardt Tigers for the 2010 NSW Premier League season.

Sydney FC

He signed for A-League club Sydney FC after impressing officials in several trials, including a friendly against Everton F.C. Moriyasu made his A-League debut off the bench for the Sky Blues, in their Round 3, 1–0 loss to Brisbane Roar

After several pleasing performances for Sydney FC, Moriyasu was offered a 2-year extension to his contract, which he accepted gratefully.

He finally scored his first goal in Sydney FC's colours in a match against Newcastle Jets at Energy Australia Stadium, in which Sydney FC won 2–1 to break their five-game losing streak.

On 20 April 2012 it was announced that he had signed to play at APIA Leichhardt as a guest player during the A-league off season.

FC Gifu
Moriyasu signed for J2 League side FC Gifu on 14 September 2012 on a free transfer from Sydney FC.

Club statistics

References

External links

 FC Gifu official website – Profile
 hIrO's liFe blog (Japanese)

1985 births
Living people
Association football people from Tokyo
Japanese footballers
J2 League players
Japan Football League players
Japan Soccer College players
Mitsubishi Mizushima FC players
Sydney FC players
FC Gifu players
Japanese expatriate footballers
Expatriate soccer players in Australia
Association football defenders
American sportspeople of Japanese descent